Waterloo—Wellington was a federal electoral district represented in the House of Commons of Canada from 1997 to 2003. It continued to be a provincial electoral district represented in the Legislative Assembly of Ontario until the 2007 provincial election.

Waterloo—Wellington was located in the province of Ontario.

Waterloo—Wellington federal riding was created in 1996 from parts of Guelph—Wellington, Kitchener, Perth—Wellington—Waterloo, Waterloo and Wellington—Grey—Dufferin—Simcoe ridings. It was abolished in 2003, and divided between Cambridge, Kitchener—Conestoga, Perth—Wellington and Wellington—Halton Hills ridings.

Waterloo—Wellington consisted of the southwest part of the City of Kitchener, the townships of Wilmot, Wellesley and Woolwich, the northwest part of the County of Wellington excluding the Village of Arthur, the Town of Mount Forest, and the Township of West Luther.

Members of Parliament

This riding has elected the following Members of Parliament:

Federal election results

Provincial election results

See also 

 List of Canadian federal electoral districts
 Past Canadian electoral districts

References

External links 

 Website of the Parliament of Canada
 Elections Ontario  1999 results and 2003 results

Former federal electoral districts of Ontario